Results of the general election to the Municipal Council of Danderyd, Sweden, held on Sunday 15 September 2002.

See also 
Elections in Sweden
Swedish Election Authority
Politics of Sweden
List of political parties in Sweden

External links 
Swedish Election Authority - Official site

Metropolitan Stockholm
Local and municipal elections in Sweden
2002 elections in Sweden